Syrmoptera homeyerii is a butterfly in the family Lycaenidae. It is found in the Democratic Republic of the Congo (Uele, Sankuru, Lualaba, Lomani, Tanganika and Maniema) and Angola.

References

Die Gross-Schmetterlinge der Erde 13: Die Afrikanischen Tagfalter. Plate XIII 66 h

Butterflies described in 1879
Theclinae
Taxa named by Hermann Dewitz
Butterflies of Africa